The Walloomsac River from the Native American name, Wal-loom-sac is a  tributary of the Hoosic River in the northeastern United States. It rises in southwestern Vermont, in the Green Mountains east of the town of Bennington in Woodford Hollow at the confluence of Bolles Brook and City Stream where it is labeled Walloomsac Brook on maps but is locally known as "The Roaring Branch".  The river then flows west toward Bennington and passes the downtown area to the north.  For many years this section was intermittent due to the water having been diverted to power mills in town (ca. 1810).  This divergence gave the name Walloomsac to a portion of the river flowing through town on the present course of South Stream.  The combined Walloomsac / South Stream joins the Roaring Branch northwest of town.  From here the river flows westward as the Walloomsac River and joins the Hoosic River below Hoosick Falls, New York.

Bridges
The river is crossed by the following roads / railroads via bridges.

Vermont
Walloomsac Brook
 - "Woodford Bridge", west of Long Trail/Appalachian Trail trailhead, washed away in flood waters related to Hurricane Irene in August 2011, and another bridge east of downtown Bennington

The Roaring Branch
 just north of its eastern terminus and SPUI interchange at Route 9 (2 one-way bridges)
North Branch Street - the bridge there is known locally as the Brooklyn Bridge
Park Street

Railroad bridge between US Route 7 and Benmont Avenue

Walloomsac River
Benmont Avenue
Hunt Street foot bridge (washed away in flood waters related to Hurricane Irene in August 2011)
 via the western leg of the "Bennington Bypass"
Silk Road via the Silk Covered Bridge
Murphy Road via two bridges at Paper Mill Village including the Paper Mill Village Covered Bridge
River Road via the Burt Henry Covered Bridge

New York
Cottrell Road in two places
Caretakers Road
Factory Hill Road

Railroad bridges in three places

Tributaries
Traveling upstream from the confluence with the Hoosic River, the following tributaries feed the Walloomsac:
Little White Creek
Paran Creek
Walloomsac River (original path through downtown Bennington, name ends at confluence of Roaring Brook and South Stream):
Roaring Brook
Barney Brook
South Stream
Jewett Brook
Roaring Branch (of South Stream)
Roaring Branch of the Walloomsac River (so named on maps from US 7 to VT 9, locally this name continues to Bolles Brook)
Furnace Brook
Stratton Brook
Basin Brook
Walloomsac Brook (so named on maps from VT 9 to confluence of Bolles Brook and City Stream)
Bolles Brook
Bickford Hollow Brook
Hell Hollow Brook
City Stream
Stamford Stream

See also
List of rivers of New York
List of rivers of Vermont
Hoosic River

References

External links
 USGS water flow statistics near North Bennington
 NOAA Advanced Hydrologic Prediction Service, Walloomsac River

Rivers of Vermont
Rivers of New York (state)
Tributaries of the Hudson River
Rivers of Bennington County, Vermont
Rivers of Rensselaer County, New York
New York placenames of Native American origin
Vermont placenames of Native American origin